The Prince of Tennis is a video game series that has games for the Game Boy Advance, Nintendo 3DS, Nintendo DS, PlayStation, PlayStation 2, and mobile platforms. All of the following video games have been released in Japanese only. Most of them were published by Konami (except the 3DS one, that was published by FuRyu).

Game Boy Advance
 The Prince of Tennis: Genius Boys Academy
 The Prince of Tennis: Aim at the Victory!
 The Prince of Tennis: 2003 Passion Red
 The Prince of Tennis: 2003 Cool Blue
 The Prince of Tennis: Minna no Oujisama
 The Prince of Tennis: 2004 Stylish Silver
 The Prince of Tennis: 2004 Glorious Gold

Nintendo 3DS
 The Prince of Tennis II: Go to the Top

Nintendo DS
 The Prince of Tennis 2005: Crystal Drive
 The Prince of Tennis Driving Smash - Side Genius
 The Prince of Tennis Driving Smash - Side King
 The Prince of Tennis: Doubles no Oujisama - Girls, be gracious!
 The Prince of Tennis: Doubles no Oujisama - Boys, be glorious!
 The Prince of Tennis: Motto Gakuensai no Oujisama -More Sweet Edition-
 The Prince of Tennis: Gyutto! Doki Doki survival  umi to yama no love passion

PlayStation 
 The Prince of Tennis
 The Prince of Tennis: Sweat & Tears

PlayStation 2
 The Prince of Tennis: Smash Hit
 The Prince of Tennis: Sweat & Tears 2
 The Prince of Tennis: Kiss of Prince -Flame Version-
 The Prince of Tennis: Kiss of Prince -Ice Version-
 The Prince of Tennis: Smash Hit 2
 The Prince of Tennis: Love of Prince -Bitter-
 The Prince of Tennis: Love of Prince -Sweet-
 The Prince of Tennis: Form the Strongest Team
 The Prince of Tennis: Rush and Dream
 The Prince of Tennis: Gakuensai no Oujisama
 The Prince of Tennis: Doki Doki Survival - Sanroku no Mystic
 The Prince of Tennis: Doki Doki Survival - Umibe no Secret
 The Prince of Tennis: Card Hunter

Mobile 
 The Prince of Tennis II & Tennis Puzzle
 The Prince of Tennis II: Rising Beat

References 

Prince of Tennis video games
Video games
Prince of Tennis, The
Lists of video games by franchise
Video games based on anime and manga